Ceraunius Tholus is a volcano on Mars located in the Tharsis quadrangle at 24.25° north latitude and 262.75° east longitude, part of the Uranius group of volcanoes.

It is generally believed to be a basaltic shield with the lower part buried beneath plain forming lavas. Earlier interpretations suggested that it is a stratovolcano.  The slopes on Ceraunius Tholus are quite steep with an average slope of 8° with many radial erosion channels and pitted valleys extending from just below the rim of the caldera toward the base of the volcano. The current view is that the valleys were eroded by water.  Interesting features on Ceraunius Tholus are three large canyons at the northwest flank of Ceraunius Tholus which are up to 2.5 km wide and 300 m deep. The biggest of these three also appears to be the youngest and protrude from the lowest point of the volcanic caldera and ends at the interesting crater Rahe (an oblique impact crater with measures of 35 × 18 km), just north from the volcano where it formed a depositional fan. Its origin is still debatable and there are four main models proposed: fluvial action, volcanic flows, valley being a lava channel or some combination of previously mentioned models.

Ceraunius appears small compared to other larger volcanoes, but it is almost as tall as Earth's Mount Everest.

The caldera of Ceranius Tholus is also dotted with many collapse pits, which are distinct from impact craters as they have no rim and vary in abundance across the caldera.  Ceraunius Tholus is probably late Hesperian in age.

The crater Paros lies south of Ceraunius Tholus, and the elongate crater Rahe is to the north.

Glaciers 
Some scientists believe that glaciers may have existed on many of the volcanoes in Tharsis including Olympus Mons, Ascraeus Mons, and Pavonis Mons.  Ceraunius Tholus may have even had its glaciers melt to form some temporary lakes in the past. The smoothness and flatness of the Ceraunius Tholus caldera floor suggests that in the past meltwater accumulated in a caldera lake.

Environment around Ceraunius Tholus 

Ceraunius Tholus is on the Tharsis rise, also called the Tharsis bulge.  Tharsis is a land of great volcanoes.  Olympus Mons is the tallest known volcano.  Ascraeus Mons and Pavonis Mons are at least 320 km across and are over 10 km above the plateau that they sit on.  The plateau is five to four seven kilometers above the zero altitude of Mars.

References

See also

 Geography of Mars
 Glaciers on Mars
 Geology of Mars
 HiRISE
 List of mountains on Mars by height
 Volcanoes on Mars
 Volcanology of Mars

Volcanoes of Mars
Tharsis quadrangle